Gary Epesso N'galy is a DR Congo professional footballer who plays as a forward.

Career statistics

Club

Notes

References

Date of birth unknown
Living people
Democratic Republic of the Congo footballers
Association football forwards
Philippines Football League players
Green Archers United F.C. players
Democratic Republic of the Congo expatriate footballers
Democratic Republic of the Congo expatriate sportspeople in the Philippines
Expatriate footballers in the Philippines
21st-century Democratic Republic of the Congo people
Year of birth missing (living people)